Michael John Fitzmaurice (born March 9, 1950) is a former United States Army soldier and a recipient of the United States military's highest decoration, the Medal of Honor, for his actions during the Vietnam War.

Military career
Fitzmaurice joined the United States Army from his birth city of Jamestown, North Dakota in 1969, and by March 23, 1971, was serving as a specialist four in Troop D, 2nd Squadron, 17th Cavalry Regiment, 101st Airborne Division.

During a firefight on that day, in Khe Sanh, Republic of Vietnam, Fitzmaurice smothered the blast of an enemy-thrown explosive charge with his flak vest and body to protect other soldiers. Seriously wounded and partially blinded by the blast, he then continued to fight the enemy. After his rifle was damaged by a second explosive blast, Fitzmaurice proceeded to acquire another rifle from a Viet Cong sapper, defeating him with his bare hands, and continued to fight, refusing medical evacuation.

Fitzmaurice survived his wounds, discharged in 1972 and was subsequently awarded the Medal of Honor for his actions in 1973.

Fitzmaurice joined the South Dakota Army and Air National  Guard and worked with local VA from 1987 and retired in 2011.

Medal of Honor citation
Specialist Fitzmaurice's official Medal of Honor citation reads:

See also

List of Medal of Honor recipients for the Vietnam War

References

1950 births
Living people
United States Army personnel of the Vietnam War
United States Army Medal of Honor recipients
People from Jamestown, North Dakota
Military personnel from North Dakota
United States Army soldiers
Vietnam War recipients of the Medal of Honor
People from Hartford, South Dakota